Tripamide (INN) is a diuretic.

Synthesis

Preparation starts by exhaustive reduction of the Diels-Alder adduct from cyclopentadiene and maleimide (1). Nitrosation of the product (2), followed by reduction of the nitroso group of 3, gives the corresponding hydrazine (4). Acylation with acid chloride 5 gives tripamide (6).

References

Diuretics
Chloroarenes
Benzamides
Nitrogen heterocycles
Sulfonamides